George David Warrington (September 19, 1952 – December 24, 2007) was an American transportation official, who served New Jersey Transit for 28 years, latterly in the post of executive director. 

He grew up in Ridgefield Park, New Jersey and graduated from Ridgefield Park High School as part of the class of 1970.

Career

Warrington served with New Jersey Transit, joining the agency on its creation in 1979, rising to the post of vice president and general manager of New Jersey Transit rail operations. From 1990 to 1992, he served as Deputy Commissioner of the New Jersey Department of Transportation. He served as Executive Director and President of the Delaware River Port Authority and Port Authority Transit Corporation from 1992 to 1994. He then served as President of Amtrak's Northeast Corridor Business Unit from 1994 to 1998. From 1998 to 2002, he served as President of Amtrak. From 2002 to March 2007, he served as executive director of New Jersey Transit. He left and with two partners, co-founded a strategic consulting and lobbying firm, Warrington Fox Shuffler in New York City (which since has dropped his name, becoming Fox and Shuffler; and has removed almost all reference to him on its website...an in memoriam item on the "Our People" page remains). He was a staunch supporter, and early advocate of the Access to the Region's Core (ARC) tunnel and promoted park-and-ride, as well as the expansion of New Jersey Transit's passenger capacity.

Death

Warrington died on December 24, 2007, after an eight-month battle with pancreatic cancer. NJ Transit and the city of Hoboken dedicated a plaza at the Hoboken Terminal to Warrington in spring 2008.

See also
James Weinstein
William Crosbie

References

1952 births
2007 deaths
Amtrak presidents
Deaths from cancer in New Jersey
Deaths from pancreatic cancer
NJ Transit people
People from Ridgefield Park, New Jersey
Ridgefield Park High School alumni